Transcontinental Limited is a 1926 American silent drama film directed by Nat Ross and starring Johnnie Walker, Eugenia Gilbert and Alec B. Francis.

Cast
 Johnnie Walker as Johnnie Lane 
 Eugenia Gilbert as Mary Reynolds 
 Alec B. Francis as Jerry Reynolds 
 Edith Murgatroyd as Sara Reynolds 
 Bruce Gordon as Joe Slavin 
 Edward Gillace as Slim 
 George Ovey as Pudge 
 Eric Mayne as Dr. Voija Pourtalis 
 James Hamel as Bob Harrison

References

Bibliography
 Munden, Kenneth White. The American Film Institute Catalog of Motion Pictures Produced in the United States, Part 1. University of California Press, 1997.

External links
 

1926 films
1926 drama films
1920s English-language films
American silent feature films
Silent American drama films
Films directed by Nat Ross
American black-and-white films
1920s American films